Keates is a surname. Notable people with the surname include:

Albert Keates (1862–1949), British pipe organ builder
Chris Keates (born 1951), British trade unionist
Dean Keates (born 1978), British footballer
Elizabeth Keates, British actress
Jonathan Keates (born 1946), British writer, biographer and novelist 
Laura Keates (born 1988), British rugby union player
Reginald Keates (born 1980), South African-born British cricketer